The Big Day is the debut studio album by American rapper Chance the Rapper, released on July 26, 2019. The album follows several mixtapes by the rapper including the reissue of his collaborative Merry Christmas Lil' Mama in 2017, and was his first solo project since Coloring Book in 2016. The album was influenced by Chance's marriage in March 2019. The album was lauded by most critics, but certain aspects of the work found limited commercial success.  The album received backlash from fans on social media and other Internet communities citing inconsistencies of quality throughout the work. The album debuted at number two on the US Billboard 200, Chance's highest-charting entry to date.

For the album, Chance worked with several songwriters including Darius Scott, Dwayne Verner, Jr., Greg Landfair, Nate Fox and Peter Wilkins.

Recording 
In a November 2016 interview, Chance the Rapper stated: "I think what I'm working on now is an album." In May and June 2018, American rapper and producer Kanye West released a set of 7-track albums as part of the Wyoming Sessions, producing five albums in collaboration with Pusha T, Kid Cudi, Nas, and Teyana Taylor. In July 2018, Chance announced that West was coming to Chicago to produce his debut album. West arrived in Chicago in mid-August 2018 and began recording. The duo later announced that their collaboration would be titled Good Ass Job. At the same time, West began working on his ninth studio album Yandhi and shifted his focus to that project instead; West has no production credits on the released version of The Big Day.

Music and lyrics 
The Big Day has been described by music journalists as a pop-rap and gospel rap record. NOW Magazines Richard Trapunski says it "presents a bigger and slicker version of [Chance the Rapper's] nostalgic gospel-rap sound", while Stephen Porzio from Hot Press says it not only features hip hop but also R&B and soul music.

Lyrically, the album follows Chance on his wedding day, inspired by his real-life marriage to Kirsten Corley in March 2019. Its predominant theme of family is explored with most songs about Kirsten and Chance's family and children. The album features contributions from his brother Taylor Bennett, who raps on "Roo", and his father Ken Bennett, who helped co-write "Eternal". In the skits "Photo Ops" and "4 Quarters in the Black", comedians John Witherspoon and Keith David play wise uncle characters to highlight the multigenerational aspect of weddings.

Artwork 
The artwork for the album cover features a jewel encrusted clear disc, reminiscent of a wedding ring, referencing the album's wedding theme, and was created by artist Sara Shakeel. Chance the Rapper reached out to Shakeel via Instagram to commission a physical object in her unique Swarovski crystal-clad style to be photographed and used for the cover art. Shakeel also created artworks for the rapper's installation "The Big Store".
Inside the album booklet, Julio Blanco provided photographs of Chance and his family.

Marketing and sales 
In March 2017, Chance stated that he would sell his debut album, as opposed to the free release of his previous mixtapes. On February 12, 2019, Chance tweeted "July" and shared a video on his Instagram revealing that he had "been making music" that fans could expect to arrive the same month. On June 27, Chance released a promotional video titled "The Next Chapter Begins", where a pre-order for the album was launched. His first two mixtapes, 10 Day and Acid Rap, were also put up on music streaming services, and sold on vinyl alongside his third mixtape Coloring Book. On July 16, Chance the Rapper announced the album's title, release date and revealed its cover during his interview on The Tonight Show Starring Jimmy Fallon.

On August 4, 2019, The Big Day debuted at number two on the US Billboard 200 with 108,000 album-equivalent units, of which 27,000 were pure album sales in its first week. It was Chance's highest-charting entry and his third release to hit the top 10 of the chart.

Critical reception

The Big Day was met with generally positive reviews, according to the aggregate website Metacritic. At the website, which assigns a normalized rating out of 100 to reviews from professional critics, the album received an average score of 71, based on 21 reviews. Aggregator AnyDecentMusic? gave it 6.8 out of 10, based on their assessment of the critical consensus. The reception was described by journalists Shaad D'Souza (of The Fader) and Ben Yakas (of Gothamist) as "lukewarm".

Reviewing in July 2019, Al Horner of The Guardian described The Big Day as "a candid, cutesy concept album based around his wedding", believing it "combines something old and something new, subtly expanding Chance’s sound without ever straying too far from the sentimental gospel-pop heart of his last release, Coloring Book"." Fred Thomas of AllMusic wrote that "Bright, flawless production supports Chance's optimistic lyrics and cultivates an atmosphere overflowing with joy, wonder, and summery nostalgia". Christopher Weingarten of Entertainment Weekly concluded, "A master lyricist, a musical omnivore, Chance and his family of producers and instrumentalists channel all the big emotions of the big day in a swirl of bliss, marital and otherwise." In a less enthusiastic review, Danny Schwartz of Rolling Stone concluded that, "Despite its length, The Big Day is self-contained, at least by Chance’s standards", considering it "narrower in emotional scope" than the 2016 mixtape Coloring Book. Dhruva Balram of NME said it is "a buoyant, cheerful project that looks back on his young, successful career through rose-tinted lenses but, ultimately, doesn't possess enough depth amidst a mishmash of production and features that make it too long-winded".

The album and Chance received overwhelming criticism from fans on social media, spawning many Internet memes primarily about the album's focus on Chance's marriage. Having expected music similar to his previous mixtapes, many fans believed that the album was a regression for the rapper, finding his raps banal and his style childishly upbeat. The music critic Anthony Fantano rated it a zero on a scale of 10, finding the production "flat" and the raps having some of Chance's "worst bars to date". The rapper responded on Twitter to the criticism, saying he believes that people wanted him to "kill himself".

The veteran music critic Robert Christgau believed The Big Day had become a "backlash victim", instead ranking it on his year-end list as 2019's third best album. In his "Consumer Guide" column on Substack, he explained that, "Since the rhyming may seem slack when you follow every word, why bother? ... [T]he opener's choral 'we-back' intro and self-sufficient lyric lighten up the room every time they come round, and that mood never dulls." While applauding the guest performances, Christgau added that the best raps belong to Chance on "Found a Good One" and "Zanies and Fools". "Both celebrate his wedding day with a cred the cameos only flesh out, a cred that will endure as art even if the marriage itself fails—this is showbiz, after all. Best wishes to the happy couple and all their progeny."

Track listing
Track listing and credits adapted from Apple Music and Tidal.

Notes
 "Photo Ops (Skit)" features uncredited vocals by John Witherspoon
 "Ballin Flossin" features uncredited vocals by DJ Casper
 "4 Quarters in the Black (Skit)" features uncredited vocals by Keith David
 "Found a Good One (Single No More)" features uncredited vocals by Lisa Mishra
 "Our House (Skit)" features uncredited vocals by Cree Summer and Jackée Harry

Samples
  "We Go High" contains a voice sample of the character Navi, voiced by Kaori Mizuhashi, from The Legend of Zelda: Ocarina of Time.
  "Handsome" contains a sample from "Honesty", written by David Bowden, and performed by Pink Sweats.
  "Ballin Flossin" contains a sample from "I Wanna Be Down", written by Keith Edward Crouch, and performed by Brandy.
  "Get a Bag" contains a sample from "Only One", written and performed by James Taylor.
  "Zanies and Fools" contains a sample from "Impossible: It's Possible" from Cinderella, written by Oscar Hammerstein II and Richard Rodgers, and performed by Rodgers.

Charts

Weekly charts

Year-end charts

Release history

References

External links 
 

2019 debut albums
Albums produced by Murda Beatz
Albums produced by Timbaland
Albums produced by Pi'erre Bourne
Chance the Rapper albums
Concept albums
Gospel albums by American artists
Pop albums by American artists
Pop-rap albums
Self-released albums
Works about wedding